In 2021, Germany was the third largest importer and exporter of consumer oriented agricultural products worldwide, and by far the most important European market for foreign producers. The retail market's key characteristics are consolidation, market saturation, strong competition and low prices. Germany is an attractive and cost-efficient location in the center of the EU. While many consumers are very price sensitive, the market also provides many wealthy consumers who follow value-for-money concepts. These consumers are looking for premium quality products and are willing to pay higher prices. Germany still has some of the lowest food prices in Europe, and German citizens spend only about 14 percent of their income on food and beverages. Low food prices are a result of high competition between discounters and the grocery retail sale segment.

History
Germany's climate has historically favored production of hardy vegetables (like turnips, cabbage and onions), as well as barley which is reflected in German Cuisine

Germany imported about a third of its food supplies in 1914. These imports were targeted from the start of 1st World War.  5 million pigs were slaughtered in 1915 and there were food riots in Berlin.   By 1916 German food was all rationed and the winter of 1916-7 became known as Kohlrübenwinter as people were forced to eat the turnips which were normally fed to animals. Weather was poor and there were manpower shortages.  There was widespread malnutrition. After the war there was much determination to achieve self-sufficiency in food, and this was a mainspring of Lebensraum policies.

The number of farms had decreased steadily in West Germany, from 1.6 million in 1950 to 630,000 in 1990. In East Germany, where farms were collectivized under the socialist regime in the 1960s, there had been about 5,100 agricultural production collectives with an average of 4,100 hectares under cultivation. Since unification, about three-quarters of the collectives have remained as cooperatives, partnerships, or joint-stock companies. Other East German collectives were broken up, ownership reverting primarily the individual farmers who had been accorded post-war title to their lands; or were privately sold, becoming about 14,000 private farms. The terms of the 1990 Unification Treaty precluded former agricultural land owners - expropriated by the Soviet Occupation authorities - from reclaiming their vast pre-war agricultural estates. In western Germany and in the newly privatized farms in eastern Germany, family farms predominate. For the 630,000 farms, there are 750,000 full-time employees. There are also, however, many more part-time employees, and most farms do not represent their owners' full-time occupation.

Although the number of farms has declined, production has actually increased through more efficient production methods. By the early 1990, a single farmer could produce enough food for seventy-five people, far more than was the case in the 1950s or 1960s.

Production
Agricultural products vary from region to region. In the flat terrain of northern Germany and especially in the eastern portions, cereals and sugar beets are grown. Elsewhere, with the terrain more hilly and even mountainous, farmers produce vegetables, milk, pork, or beef. Almost all large cities are surrounded by fruit orchards and vegetable farms. Most river valleys in southern and western Germany, especially along the Rhine and the Main, have vineyards. Beer is produced mainly, but not exclusively, in Bavaria. Wine is produced mainly, but not exclusively, in Rhineland-Palatinate.

In 2018, Germany produced 26.1 million tons of sugar beet (4th largest producer in the world), which serves to produce sugar and ethanol; 20.2 million tons of wheat (10th largest producer in the world); 9.5 million tons of barley (3rd largest producer in the world, only behind Russia and France), 8.9 million tons of potato (7th largest producer in the world); 3.6 million tons of rapeseed (6th largest producer in the world); 2.2 million tons of rye (largest producer in the world); 1.9 million tons of triticale (2nd largest producer in the world); 1.4 million tons of grape (16th largest producer in the world); 1.2 million tons of apple (12th largest producer in the world). In addition, in 2018, the country also produced 3.3 million tons of maize and smaller yields of other agricultural products, such as cabbage (604 thousand tons), carrot (625 thousand tons), oats (577 thousand tons), onion (409 thousand tons), etc.

German agriculture and EU
Since the 1960s, German agricultural policy has not been made in Germany but in the EC. All agricultural laws and regulations are written in Brussels, often after difficult negotiations between food-producing and food-consuming states. The main objective of those negotiations is to obtain high incomes for the farmers while keeping market prices low enough to avoid consumer protests. To make up the difference, the EC adopted the Common Agricultural Policy (CAP—see Glossary) subsidy program and the export subsidy program, both of which benefit German farmers as well as other EU farmers. In return, the German farmers have complied with European directives on the quality and quantity of production. 

Germany embraces EU’s Farm to Fork spirit with nutrition strategy plans, With plans for a national nutrition strategy in the EU Farm to Form vein, German agriculture minister Cem Özdemir wants to make diets healthier and more plant-based, but some say the proposal is dictating what people can and cannot eat.

See also
Agriculture in East Germany
Food and agriculture in Nazi Germany
Plantation
 German wine

References

External links

Country studies

 
German cuisine
Agricultural policy
German wine